Philip Reid (born 12 November 1961) is a sports journalist. As of 2017 he worked for The Irish Times newspaper. His articles on golf are widely quoted by other media outlets.

Career
Reid is a journalism graduate of Dublin Institute of Technology. He began his journalistic career with The Irish Press newspaper group in 1985. He joined The Irish Times as a staff writer in 1996. Reid is the secretary of the Irish Golf Writers' Association and is a committee member of the UK-based Association of Golf Writers. He lives in Dublin.

Reid has covered every Ryder Cup since 1993. His coverage of the 2006 Ryder Cup, a notable victory by Europe over the US, was the basis of his book The Cup, published by Maverick House. He was one of four international golf journalists invited by the International Herald Tribune to a sports forum assessing US and European chances in the 2008 Ryder Cup.

Works

Review: "Ryder Cup Books", Ryder Cup Diary, 2010.
"The Irish Majors" (Gill and Macmillan) was published in October 2012.

References

External links
 "Ryder Cup, part four: The home course and the home team"

1961 births
Living people
Irish sportswriters
The Irish Times people
Alumni of Dublin Institute of Technology